Hare Remover is a Merrie Melodies cartoon starring Bugs Bunny and Elmer Fudd, released in 1946. The film was the second Bugs Bunny cartoon to be directed by Frank Tashlin, the first being The Unruly Hare (1945). It was also the last short Tashlin directed before leaving Warner Bros. in 1944 to direct live-action films. His animation unit was handed over to Robert McKimson upon his departure.

Plot
Mad scientist Elmer tries his best to make a "Jekyll and Hyde potion", but his experiments always end in failure, causing one of his test animals, a dog, to run out and eat grass. He decides to trap a rabbit (Bugs Bunny) as his next subject. After he traps Bugs, Elmer gives Bugs the potion, but to no avail. Elmer has a crying fit until Bugs gives him one of the potions, giving Elmer the same initial looney side effects as the other animals had experienced.

 When a Big bear enters the lab from the nearby forest, both Bugs and Elmer mistake the Big bear for one another, until Elmer becomes angry at the bear (still thinking that it is Bugs) after the bear refuses the potion that was going to cure him, which was the same potion Bugs gave to the bear earlier and which made the bear disgusted. Elmer scolds the bear until he discovers that the bear isn't Bugs Bunny when the real Bugs is at the window. Elmer realizes his mistake, and the enraged bear chases Elmer and ends up on the warpath against him, while Elmer is sobbingly panickedly begging the bear not to literally kill him. Elmer, after heeding Bugs' option, plays dead to fool the bear, and is saved by his bad odor. Elmer thinks he's safe until he thinks he hears the bear again. Meanwhile, the bear is standing on the side of the room watching them, convinced that both Elmer and Bugs are crazy, flashing rebus picture cards to the audience showing a screw with a ball, a cracked pot, a dripping faucet, bats in the belfry, etc.

Home media
This cartoon is found on Volume 3 of the Looney Tunes Golden Collection.

Sources

See also
 Looney Tunes and Merrie Melodies filmography (1940–1949)
 List of Bugs Bunny cartoons

References

External links

1946 films
1946 short films
1946 animated films
Merrie Melodies short films
Short films directed by Frank Tashlin
Animated films about bears
Mad scientist films
Bugs Bunny films
Elmer Fudd films
1940s Warner Bros. animated short films